Alois Kolb (2 February 1875, in Vienna – 5 April 1942, in Leipzig) was an Austrian etcher, painter and graphic artist.

Gallery

References 

1875 births
1942 deaths
Artists from Vienna
Austrian etchers
19th-century Austrian painters
Austrian male painters
20th-century Austrian painters
20th-century printmakers
19th-century Austrian male artists
20th-century Austrian male artists